Jean-Claude Trial (13 December 1732 - 23 June 1771) was a French composer and, with Pierre Montan Berton, co-director of the Académie Royale de Musique 1767-1771, following François Francœur and François Rebel and preceding Antoine Dauvergne and Nicolas-René Joliveau. It was during his and Berton's directorship that the main hall at the Palais Royal burned down on 6 April 1763.

Trial was born in Avignon.  His opera Silvie, 1765, co-written with Pierre Montan Berton, was the last pastorale héroïque to be written by French composers.  He died in Paris, aged 38, shortly after the destruction of the hall.

Works, editions and recordings
Sylvie, Fontainebleau 1765
Théonis ou Le Toucher, Académie Royale de Musique, November 10, 1767

References

1732 births
1771 deaths
Musicians from Avignon
French opera composers
French male composers
18th-century French male classical violinists
Directors of the Paris Opera
18th-century French composers
French ballet composers